Courtney Smith (born October 17, 1984) is a former American football cornerback. He was signed by the Baltimore Ravens of the National Football League as an undrafted free agent in 2010. He played college football at Central Washington. He was also a member of the San Jose SaberCats and Arizona Rattlers of the Arena Football League.

College career
Smith played college football at Central Washington University in 2008 and 2009. He had played the previous years at Langston University in Oklahoma.

Professional career

Baltimore Ravens
Smith was not selected in the 2010 NFL Draft, but was signed as an undrafted free agent immediately after the draft by the Baltimore Ravens. He was waived on June 17, 2010. On September 23, 2010 San Jose Saber Cats announced the signing of Courtney Smith to their active roster.

San Jose SaberCats
Smith signed with the San Jose SaberCats of the Arena Football League on September 22, 2010. He was released by the SaberCats on April 6, 2011.

Arizona Rattlers
Smith was signed by the Arizona Rattlers on July 6, 2011. He was placed on injured reserve on August 5, 2011. He was released by the Rattlers on January 30, 2012.

References

External links
Baltimore Ravens bio
Central Washington Wildcats bio
http://www.oursportscentral.com/services/releases/?id=4094756

1984 births
Living people
Players of American football from Stockton, California
American football cornerbacks
Central Washington Wildcats football players
Langston Lions football players
Baltimore Ravens players
San Jose SaberCats players
Arizona Rattlers players